Nose goes or the nose game, also uncommonly called the "rule of nose goes", is a popular selection method most commonly used when deciding which of several persons is assigned an unwanted task. Whoever touches their nose last does the task.

Rules
The game may have different rules depending on area, but commonly: 

At any time, anyone can put their finger on their own nose
There has to be a total of three or more persons for game to qualify.
This signals everyone paying attention to do the same
The last person to put their finger on their nose gets assigned the task
If none of the other people play the game, the person who started nose goes is assigned the task

Example of play
One member of a group notices that something (usually a small or simple errand or task) needs to be done. They mention it and then call the name of the game, placing their index finger on the tip of their nose. As the other members of the group acknowledge the task, they also place their index fingers on the tips of their noses. The last person to do this is the person who has to perform the task. Toes may count if one's hands are unavailable at time of "nose goes". In some versions of the game, the starting player must shout "No nose goes", "Not it", or "Nose goes!" to begin the game, however, in other versions no announcement is necessary, and simply the last person to notice the game has to perform the task.

Variations
Nose goes does not have to be initiated by an individual of an unwanted task or bill. The last person to realize nose goes has begun and places their finger on their nose is stuck with the task or bill.

A slightly different version of this game is frequently played in the Netherlands, mostly in student circles. The basics are the same, except instead of touching their nose, participants must make a "dakje" (Dutch; "roof") above their head by placing the tips of their fingers together and making an upside-down V ("Λ"). The game is usually started out by one person who acknowledges a task that needs to be done, and calls out "zonder" ("without") followed by the task. People who make the "roof" are exempt from having to do the task, and so the last person to make the roof is the one who has to do it.

See also
 Human nose
 I've got your nose

References

Children's games